Linda Anne Ballantyne (born October 24, 1964) is a Canadian voice actress, who is best known for voicing the title role of Serena Tsukino/Sailor Moon in the second half of the original English version of Sailor Moon.

Early life

Ballantyne was born in Toronto, Ontario on October 24, 1964.

Career
Ballantyne began her voice acting career in 1999 for the animated series, The Avengers: United They Stand as the voice of Wasp/Janet Van Dyne.

In 2000, she voiced Percy in the 2000 fantasy film, Thomas and the Magic Railroad, replacing Michael Angelis in the final cut.

Ballantyne would later provide the voice of Champ Bear in the Care Bears films, Care Bears: Journey to Joke-a-lot and The Care Bears' Big Wish Movie, as well as the voice of Wicked in the PBS Kids long running children's television series, Cyberchase.

She also had recurring voice roles in Yin Yang Yo! and briefly voiced Violet Vanderfleet in the animated series, Totally Spies.

Filmography

Film

Anime

Animation

References

External links

1964 births
Living people
Canadian voice actresses
Actresses from Toronto
20th-century Canadian actresses
21st-century Canadian actresses